Senator McDermott may refer to:

Allan Langdon McDermott (1854–1908), New Jersey State Senate
Frank X. McDermott (1924–2011), New Jersey State Senate
Jim McDermott (born 1936), Washington State Senate
Joe McDermott (politician) (born 1967), Washington State Senate
Joseph H. McDermott (1871–1930), West Virginia State Senate